The Animals in War Memorial is a war memorial, in Hyde Park, London, commemorating the countless animals that have served and died under British military command throughout history. It was designed by English sculptor David Backhouse and unveiled in November 2004 by Anne, Princess Royal.

History 
The memorial was inspired by Jilly Cooper's 1983 book Animals in War, and was made possible by a specially created fund of £1.4 million from public donations of which Cooper was a co-trustee. The memorial consists of a 55 ft by 58 ft (16.8 m by 17.7 m) curved Portland stone wall: the symbolic arena of war, emblazoned with images of various struggling animals, along with two heavily laden bronze mules progressing up the stairs of the monument, and a bronze horse and bronze dog beyond it looking into the distance.

Located on Park Lane, at the junction with Upper Brook Street, on the eastern edge of the park, The Animals in War Memorial was officially opened on 24 November 2004 by Anne, Princess Royal.

In May 2013 it was one of two London war memorials vandalised on the same night. The word "Islam" was spray-painted on it causing £2,766 in damage, and the nearby RAF Bomber Command Memorial suffered £6,500 in damage. A 31-year-old man later admitted to vandalising the memorials and was charged for a total of 94 vandalism and destruction of property offences carried out over several weeks against homes, cars, memorials and a church, causing over £50,000 in damage.

Inscriptions 
The inscriptions are in various fonts and sizes and are all uppercase. Other than the featured messages, there are several inscriptions on the rear or outside, and on the inner edges of the wings (in the gap), attributing the creators and funders.

On the face of the right wing when viewed from the front or inside
Main heading; the largest and heaviest cut inscription
Animals in War
Directly beneath the main heading
This monument is dedicated to all the animalsthat served and died alongside British and allied forcesin wars and campaigns throughout time
Beneath and to the right of the main heading
They had no choice
On the face of the left wing when viewed from the rear or outside (on the reverse of the main heading)
Manyand variousanimals were employedto support British and Allied Forcesin wars and campaigns over the centuriesand as a result millions died · From the pigeon to theelephant they all played a vital role in every region of the worldin the cause of human freedom · Their contribution must never be forgotten

See also
 Purple poppy – a symbol of remembrance in the United Kingdom for animals that served during wartime
 Dickin Medal – instituted in 1943 in the United Kingdom by Maria Dickin to honour the work of animals in World War II
 PDSA Gold Medal – recognised as the animal equivalent of the George Cross; acknowledges the bravery and devotion to duty of animals

References

External links

 The Official Animals In War Memorial Fund Website
 An audio link from Clinton Rogers of the BBC
 Another brief article, featuring a number of pictures of the memorial
 Another article focused on the sculpting of the monument
 An article giving substantial detail on particular animals honoured by the memorial

Animal monuments
Monuments and memorials in London
Military memorials in London
2004 sculptures
Stone sculptures in the United Kingdom
Bronze sculptures in the United Kingdom
2004 establishments in England
Mammals in art
Animal sculptures in the United Kingdom
Vandalized works of art in the United Kingdom
Sculptures of dogs in the United Kingdom
Horses in art